The Women's Individual Time Trial at the 1994 World Cycling Championships was held on Thursday 25 August 1994, in Agrigento/Catania, Italy over 30 kilometres.

The women's individual time trial (ITT) was added to the world championships as a replacement for the team time trial.

Final classification

References
the-sports.org

Women's Time Trial
UCI Road World Championships – Women's time trial
UCI